Okiek or Ogiek may refer to:
the Okiek people
the Ogiek language